Vani Jairam is an Indian playback singer who has sung over 4,000 songs. She has sung nearly 600 songs in Kannada films. The following is a list of Kannada songs recorded by her:

film songs

1970s

1980s

1980

1981

1982

1983

1984

1985

1986

1987

1988

1989

1990-present

References

Jairam, Vani